Le Jour où Beaumont fit connaissance avec sa douleur is a novella written in French by French Nobel laureate writer J. M. G. Le Clézio. It is one of the first published texts he wrote. This novella was published in book form after the famous Le Procès-Verbal (The Official Report), his first novel which won the Renaudot Prize in 1963. This novella was also included in a collection of short stories entitled La fièvre (The Fever), (pages 60 to 87).

Title in English
Le Jour où Beaumont fit connaissance avec sa douleur could be translated as The Day Beaumont Became Acquainted with His Pain or, The Day Beaumont Became Aware of His Pain, or even "The Day Beaumont Met His Pain."

Reviews
There is a review in a blog called The Valve, where this novella was mentioned as having piqued the author's interest because of an opening paragraph written in the same style as Malone Meurt (Malone Dies):

Publication history

French magazine 
"Le jour où Beaumont fit connaissance avec sa douleur." Paris, page à page. Textes choisis et annotés par Pierre-Edmond Robert. (Texts selected and annotated by Pierre-Edmond Robert.) Hatier: Dider, Paris, 191p.e

First French Edition

Second French Edition

Third French Edition

Fourth French Edition

References

1964 French novels
Novels by J. M. G. Le Clézio
French novellas
Works by J. M. G. Le Clézio